Nucleolar protein 8 is a protein that in humans is encoded by the NOL8 gene.

Interactions 

NOL8 has been shown to interact with RRAGA and NIP7.

References

Further reading